Dierks High School is a public high school in Dierks, Arkansas, United States that serves more than 250 students in grades 7 through 12. It is one of four public high schools in Howard County and the only high school managed by the Dierks School District.

Academics 
The assumed course of study is the Smart Core curriculum developed by the Arkansas Department of Education.  Students may engage in regular and Advanced Placement (AP) coursework and exams prior to graduation. Dierks has been accredited by AdvancED (formerly North Central Association) since 1959.

The high school is listed unranked in the Best High Schools 2012 Report by U.S. News & World Report.

Athletics 
The Dierks High School mascot and athletic emblem are the Outlaws (a wild, unbreakable horse) with the school colors of blue and white.

For 2012–14, the Dierks Outlaws participated in the 2A Classification in the 2A 7 (football) and 2A 7 East (basketball) Conference for interscholastic activities administered by the Arkansas Activities Association (AAA) including football, golf (boys/girls), basketball (boys/girls), cheer, baseball, softball, and track and field.

 Football: The Outlaws football team won a state football championship in 1975.

References

External links
 

Public high schools in Arkansas
Schools in Howard County, Arkansas